Kamarkuh (also Romanized as Kamarkūh) is a village in Kolah Boz-e Sharqi Rural District, in the Central District of Meyaneh County, East Azerbaijan Province, Iran. At the 2006 census, its population was 337, in 63 families.

References 

Populated places in Meyaneh County